Nekpen Obasogie is a Canada-based Nigerian writer. She is the author of the book titled "Great Benin: The Alcazar of Post-Colonial Culture". In 2022, she received the honorary Pen Award for her contributions to the promotion of the Benin culture.

Background 
Nekpen Obasogie was born in Benin City, the capital city of Edo State in Nigeria. She later moved to Canada where she now resides. Her interest in Benin History and culture have seen her produced different literary piece in the subject area. This include her books titled “The Life of Princess Adesuwa” and "Great Benin: The Alcazar of Post-Colonial Culture".

Books 

 Great Benin: The Alcazar of Post-Colonial Culture
 The Life of Princess Adesuwa

See also 
 NEBO TV Magazine

References

External links 
 NEBO TV Canada

Living people
Nigerian writers
Year of birth missing (living people)